Five Points is an unincorporated community in Monroe Township, Pickaway County, in the U.S. state of Ohio.

History
The community took its name from a 5-way intersection at the original town site. The first store in the vicinity was started at Five Points in 1849. A post office called Five Points was established in 1853, and remained in operation until 1905.

References

Unincorporated communities in Pickaway County, Ohio
Unincorporated communities in Ohio